Soacha Province is one of the 15 provinces in the Cundinamarca Department, Colombia. Soacha is considered the only borough in the country, and a part of Bogotá, but legally the Colombian Republic considers it a municipality.

Etymology 
The name of the province Soacha is derived from the Chibcha words Súa; Sun god Sué and chá, "man"; "Man of the Sun".

Subdivision 
Soacha is divided into 2 municipalities:

References 

Provinces of Cundinamarca Department
Province